Colonial Gardens Commercial Historic District is a national historic district located at South Bend, St. Joseph County, Indiana.  It encompasses four contributing buildings on a commercial strip in South Bend. It developed between about 1925 and 1947, and includes notable examples of Classical Revival style architecture.  The buildings are tan brick commercial buildings with terra cotta trim.  They include the former River Park Theater (1927) and Colonial Building.

It was listed on the National Register of Historic Places in 1997.

References

Historic districts on the National Register of Historic Places in Indiana
Commercial buildings on the National Register of Historic Places in Indiana
Neoclassical architecture in Indiana
Historic districts in South Bend, Indiana
National Register of Historic Places in St. Joseph County, Indiana